Ronald Idris Baggott (16 January 1917—26 April 2013) was an Australian rules footballer who played with Melbourne in the Victorian Football League (VFL). He later captain-coached Brunswick.

He was the younger brother of Jack Baggott who played for Richmond.

References

External links

DemonWiki profile

1917 births
Australian rules footballers from Melbourne
Melbourne Football Club players
Keith 'Bluey' Truscott Trophy winners
Brunswick Football Club players
Brunswick Football Club coaches
2013 deaths
Melbourne Football Club Premiership players
Three-time VFL/AFL Premiership players
People from South Melbourne